Paul Gorman is an English writer.

Paul Gorman may also refer to:

Paul Gorman (footballer, born 1963), Irish football player
Paul Gorman (footballer, born 1968), English football player
Paul F. Gorman (born 1927), United States Army general